Welcome to My Party is Rusted Root's fifth studio album. It marked a departure from the tribal grooves of the group's previous work to a poppier sound. Both "Welcome to My Party" and "Blue Diamonds" were released as singles.

Track listing 
All songs written by Michael Glabicki except where noted.
 "Union 7" (Glabicki, Jenn Wertz) – 4:39
 "Welcome to My Party" – 3:49
 "Women Got My Money" – 4:38
 "Blue Diamonds" – 4:56
 "Weave" (Wertz) – 3:59
 "Artificial Winter" – 4:17
 "Too Much" (Liz Berlin) – 4:24
 "Sweet Mary" – 3:43
 "Hands are Law" – 4:18
 "Cry" (Patrick Norman, Glabicki) – 2:52
 "People of My Village" (Jim Donovan, Glabicki) – 5:39

Personnel 

 Michael Glabicki – vocals, guitar
 Jenn Wertz – vocals
 Patrick Norman – bass, vocals
 Liz Berlin – vocals
 Jim Donovan – drums, percussion
 John Buynak – guitar
 John McDowell – keyboards
 Bill Bottrell – producer, Engineer, mixer
 Roxanne Webber – assistant engineer
 Calvin Turnbull – assistant engineer

References

Rusted Root albums
2002 albums
Island Records albums
Albums produced by Bill Bottrell